The Lower Saxon Hills are one of the 73 natural regions in Germany defined by the Federal Agency for Nature Conservation (BfN). Geographically it covers roughly the same area as the Weser Uplands in its wider sense.

It is classified as region number D 36 by the BfN; its full name being the Niedersächsisches Bergland (mit Weser- und Leine-Bergland (Lower Saxon Hills, including the Weser and Leine Hills).

D 36 is a newly defined region that incorporates 3 geographical units from the old system: numbers 36, 37 and 53, and includes all parts of the Weser Uplands (Weserbergland) in both its narrower and a wider sense. That said, all three elements of the region, despite their misleading names, cover far more than is generally meant in everyday language or in atlases by the term Weserbergland.

In addition the Weser-Leine Hills sub-division (37) includes the whole of the Leine Uplands (Leinebergland), whilst the Harz mountains, admittedly are only partly in Lower Saxony, are clearly older in geological time scale and have been given their own natural region (D37) rather than being grouped with the lower Saxon Hills.

Natural divisions 
The following tables show the landscape sub-divisions in the Lower Saxon Hills. 
Those regions which are normally considered part of the Weser Uplands in its narrower sense are indicated by (W); similarly the which are normally included in the Leine Uplands are annotated with (L): 

37 Weser-Leine Uplands

References

Literature 

Natural regions of the Central Uplands
Central Uplands
Regions of Lower Saxony
Regions of North Rhine-Westphalia